Luraghi is an Italian surname. Notable people with the surname include:

 Giuseppe Luraghi (1905–1991), Italian lyricist and engineer
 Nino Luraghi (born 1964), Italian ancient historian
  (1921–2012), Italian historian and university teacher

Italian-language surnames